Pakkora is a village of the Ishkoman valley in Pakistan. It is located 95 km north west of Gilgit city. The village has a population of about 3500 according to the 1998 census.

Geography
Pakkora is connected to the Hunza Valley via the Naltar pass from its northeastern side while annexed to the Pamir mountain range to the northwest. The village is bounded and surrounded between the Hindukush and the great Karakorum mountain ranges.

It has a diverse weather pattern. The climate remains moderate all year.

Culture and economy
Khowar, Shina, Burushaski, Gujri and Wakhi are the lingua franca of Pakkora. As much as 60% of this village is educated. There is one Inter college and two high schools. The main source of income is cultivation of wheat, corn, potatoes, and fruit. Bread and butter are sustained by the gemstones and by government employment.

External links
 Paklinks.com
 irc.nl

Populated places in Ghizer District